Dönmem Yolumdan (I Don't Retract from My Way) is the name of a Turkish album by Asya. It is her fourth studio album, released in Turkey on July 3, 2002.

Track listing
 "Nazara Geldik" (We Were Struck by The Evil Eye)
 "35 Yaş" (Age of 35)
 "Dönmem Yolumdan" (I don't Retract from My Way)
 "Boşver Hayat Kısa" (Never Mind, Life is Short)
 "Martı Kuşları" (Gulls)
 "Sönsün Bu Ateş" (Let The Fire Put Out)
 "Hata Kimde" (Who is Faulty)
 "Sensiz Saadet" (Happiness without You)
 "Allah Korkusu" (Fear of God)
 "İstanbul" (Istanbul)
 "Beni Unutma" (Don't Forget Me)
 "Sahnede" (on The Stage)

Music and lyrics
Asya, Hamit Ündaş, Eugene Raskin, Şehrazat, Emre Irmak, Yaşar Güvenir, Erol Savaş

Asya (singer) albums
2002 albums